Imno  is a village in the administrative district of Gmina Golczewo, within Kamień County, West Pomeranian Voivodeship, in north-western Poland.

Imno is the seat of the Polish Shetland Pony Society.

For the history of the region, see History of Pomerania.

References

Villages in Kamień County